Antelope Hot Springs (also Hart Mountain Hot Springs) are natural hot springs located in southeastern Oregon, U.S.  northeast of Lakeview and  northeast of the community of Plush, a  drive.

The pool is about 5 feet deep and 9 by 12 across (150 cm deep, 3 m x 4 m).
The pool can accommodate six people.
A posted sign requests that nudists lock the door, though one author suggests the remote location renders such formality unnecessary.

Reportedly a rancher noticed some water bubbling from a rock and blasted it with dynamite resulting in a hot spring pool.

There appears to be no official name for the springs, which GNIS refers to only as Hot Springs,
and U.S. topographic maps label similarly.

References 

Hot springs of Oregon
Bodies of water of Lake County, Oregon